Edward Edwards (24 September 1883 – 20 April 1970) was an Australian rules footballer who played with St Kilda in the Victorian Football League (VFL).

Notes

External links 

1883 births
1970 deaths
Australian rules footballers from Victoria (Australia)
St Kilda Football Club players
People educated at Scotch College, Melbourne